Diplomatie (English: Diplomacy) is a 2011 play by French playwright Cyril Gély. In 2014, it was adapted into a major motion picture of the same name (see Diplomacy (2014 film)).

References

2011 plays
French plays